Culex (Culex) jacksoni is a species of mosquito belonging to the genus Culex. It is found in China, Hong Kong, India, South Korea, Nepal, maritime Russia (Furugelm island), Sri Lanka, Thailand, and Taiwan.

References

External links 
Detection of Culex jacksoni Edwards (1934) among the mosquitoes of the Furugelm island

jacksoni
Insects described in 1934